The International 2.4mR is a one-person keelboat. The class is a development class governed by the 2.4mR rule. The rule controlled by World Sailing (formerly known as ISAF) is one of the few classes designated as an International Class. The International 2.4mR Class rule is closely related to the International 12mR class rule that was used at the America's Cup.

While there is a small but active group of amateur or professional designers and builders around the world, around 90% of the 2.4mR boats are the commercially produced Norlin Mark III designed by Swedish yacht designer Peter Norlin. Over the years, new 2.4mR designs such as the Stradivari III, the Proton and the Super 3 have come into production.

The 2.4mR boats are primarily used for racing and the class holds highly competitive national events in many countries. World and European championships can attract as many as 100 boats at a time. 

The 2.4mR is ideal for adaptive sailing since the sailor barely moves in the boat, and all settings can be adjusted from a facing forward seated position. Both hand-steering and foot-steering are possible. The boat is sailed without a spinnaker, but it is equipped with a whisker-pole that is extending outward to hold the shape of the jib when sailing downwind. The boat's capability as a truly inclusive sailing boat has been demonstrated over many years at multiple Open World Championships.

History
After the 1980 America's Cup, people in the Newport, RI area started sailing boats called Mini-12s. They were named after the 12-Metre yachts that were used at the America's Cup. As the fleet started to grow, the word spread to Sweden, home of the yacht designer Peter Norlin. Peter Norlin refined the original designs, and along with other naval architects, they collectively initiated the International 2.4mR Class that we know today. Although the 2.4mR is a development class, Peter Norlin has become the dominant designer, and the class is therefore often mistaken as a one-design class.

One-design
In recent years attempts have been made to develop a one-design class based on the 2.4 Norlin Mark III. This was primarily because the competition within the Paralympics was meant to be more about the sailors' competitiveness and less about the equipment. This led to the introduction of Appendix K to the Class rules and a group of individuals started to work on a set of stand-alone one-design rules. This is still at the early stages but this effort is likely to lead to the emergence of a new one-design 2.4mR class alongside the existing development 2.4mR class.

Rating formula
As an open class rather than a one-design, all boat designs must meet the following formula.

(all measurements in mm)
 L = the "corrected" length of the hull (see rule D.6.3)
 d = the midship girth difference (see rule D.6.4)
 F = the average freeboard height (see rule D.6.5)
 S = the total rated area of the mainsail and jib combined.

Events

Open World Championships

Para World Sailing Championships

The 2.4 metre has been used a number of times as equipment for the One-Person Technical Disabled discipline which holds an annual World Championships.

Paralympics

From 2000 to 2016, the 2.4 Metre was the official single-crew class boat for sailing at the Summer Paralympics although it was used in a more one-design form utilising the Norlin Mk3 design.

References

External links 

 The Official site of the International 2.4mR Class Association
 2.4mR (World Sailing)
 Malmsten Boats
 Charger 2.4 
 Super 3
 Australian 2.4mR National Class Association
 Austrian 2.4mR National Class Association
 Canadian 2.4mR National Class Association
 Czech 2.4mR National Class Association
 Dutch 2.4mR National Class Association
 Finnish 2.4mR National Class Association
 French 2.4mR National Class Association
 German 2.4mR National Class Association
 Hong Kong 2.4mR National Class Association
 Italian 2.4mR National Class Association
 Norwegian 2.4mR National Class Association
 Swedish National Class Association
 UK 2.4mR National Class Association
 US 2.4mR National Class Association

 
Classes of World Sailing
Keelboats
Development sailing classes
Sailboat type designs by Peter Norlin